Auguste Rejon (born 23 July 1893 in La Trinité, Martinique and died 7 March 1973 in La Trinité) was a politician from Martinique who was elected to the French Senate in 1958.

References
 Page on the French Senate website

Martiniquais politicians
French people of Martiniquais descent
French Senators of the Fourth Republic
1893 births
1973 deaths
Senators of Martinique